Dongnae Station is a station of the Busan Metro Line 1 and Busan Metro Line 4 in Oncheon-dong and Myeongnyun-dong, Dongnae District, Busan, South Korea. The station is unrelated to the Dongnae Station of Korail.

Station Layout

Line 1

Line 4

Gallery

External links
  Cyber station information from Busan Transportation Corporation
  Cyber station information from Busan Transportation Corporation

Busan Metro stations
Dongnae District
Railway stations in South Korea opened in 1985